Belford Roxo is a city in the state of Rio de Janeiro, Brazil. It is a part of the metropolitan region of the city of Rio de Janeiro and was created in 1990. Its population was 513,118 in 2020 and its area is 79 km². Belford Roxo is one of the less prosperous cities in the state, due to its low GDP and relatively large population. Its climate is tropical with an average temperature of 18 °C (63 °F). Bayer and Lubrizol are the biggest companies in the municipality. It was named after Engineer Raimundo Teixeira Belfort Roxo. While serving as General Construction and Building Inspector for the city of Rio de Janeiro, Belfort Roxo, together with fellow engineer Paulo de Frontin, solved the water shortage problems of the area during the summer of 1889.

The city gained fame from the samba school Lambs of Belford Roxo, parading annually in the carnival of the city of Rio de Janeiro. Currently the municipality is the seventh most populous of Rio de Janeiro, with 479,386 inhabitants, according to IBGE estimates for 2014, and has the 14th largest state GDP, with R$3,539,442,000 thousand. Nevertheless, its per capita income in 2008 was R$7,140.38, one of the state's lowest. When comparing social indicators with other cities in the state such as Niterói and Petrópolis, the municipality provides basic services and infrastructure at lower standards than other neighboring municipalities. Its HDI is 0.684, which despite being considered average by calculating the IBGE / 2010, according to UN standards is well below the average of the state of Rio de Janeiro (0.768), and the national average (0.744).

History 

A few years after the expulsion of the French, the governor of Rio de Janeiro, Christopher de Barros, gave the captain Belchior Azeredo one sesmaria on the river Sarapuí, on the old site of a village of the Jacutinga indigenous people. There, he founded the Santo Antônio mill Jacutinga, which would become the current municipality of Belford Roxo. A shrine to St. Anthony was built on a hillside 750 meters from the Sarapuí river bank, near the site established for port activities.

At the dawn of the seventeenth century, the Holy mill Antonio Jacutinga was dismembered, appearing then the maxambomba mill (Nova Iguaçu) and the ingenuity of Poce (Tenure). In the eighteenth century, a new break (this time in maxambomba, the mill lands) has raised the Caxoeira mill (Mosque), on land that belonged to the governor of Rio de Janeiro Salvador de Sá. For over two hundred years, the land remained, by hereditary succession, under the control of the heirs of Salvador de Sá, the Vasques Correia family.

In the middle of that eighteenth century, the lands of the San Antonio sugar mill again be dismembered for the formation of new devices: the Brejo and Sarapuí. In the same period, the lands of maxambomba ingenuity were dismembered for the formation of Madureira ingenuity.

In 1767, in a topographic map of the captaincy of Rio de Janeiro, made by Manuel Vieira Lion, appears clearly in this region the ingenuity of Brejo. Its first occupant was Christopher Mendes Leitão, in 1739.

The Baixada Fluminense is divided by the Sarapuí River and was surrounded by marshes and swamps. On these banks, a port grew with trade in sugar, rice, beans, corn, and brandy.

After a succession of owners in 1815, Father Miguel Arcanjo Leitão, who owned the land and sold them to the first Viscount of Barbacena, Felisberto Caldeira Brant, future Marquis of Barbacena.

In 1843, Peter Brant, the Comte de Iguaçu - son of the first Viscount and Marquis of Barbacena - took over the farm after his father's death, which occurred in the city of Rio de Janeiro on July 13, 1842.

In 1851, the Brant Boiler family sold their farm to the Commander Manuel José Coelho da Rocha.

In the second half of the nineteenth century, the estate fell into decay due to the occurrence of epidemics. The laying of tracks for crossing the Rio d'Ouro railway, dividing the Heath farm in 1872 on land donated by the Rock Rabbit descendants, began a movement claiming to turn it on railway line passengers, as previously, this railway was built to capture water in Tinguá saws, Rio d'Ouro and San Pedro, with placement of aqueducts along its margin.

Geography 

Occupying an area of 79,791 square kilometers, Belford Roxo currently has 481,127 inhabitants. It is the seventh-most populous city in the state. The municipal seat has the following geographical coordinates: 22º 45' 50" south latitude and 43º 26' 56" west longitude. Located in the Baixada Fluminense, in the micro region of Rio de Janeiro, it borders the municipalities of Nova Iguaçu and Mesquita (west); Saint John's Wood (South); and Duque de Caxias (east).

Relief 
The topography of the city is gently rugged, with many hills. The high point is approximately 121 meters. In the southern and northern part of town, there are elevations on the east and west side, with the north APA Alto Iguaçu (Environmental Protection Area) and Maringa-Recantus APA, with several preserved vegetation hills.

Vegetation 
The vegetation consisted of swamps and marshes and across the Baixada Fluminense. Also along the lines of Baixada, it was almost all cleared to give way to the city. Much of the north of Belford Roxo is occupied by extensive forests, on the border with the municipalities of Duque de Caxias and Nova Iguaçu, a place called as Iguaçuana Forest, it is where the river flows into Boots on the Iguaçu River. It is where it is located the Maringa-Recantus APA. Currently 3.34% of the county soil are secondary vegetation; 5.62% are areas of fields and pasture and 85.20% of the territory are urban area.

Hydrography 

The city is located in the Hydrographic Region 5 of the State of Rio de Janeiro, covering the basins of the rivers that are born on the slopes of Serra do Mar, in the hills and in coastal massifs, flowing into the bay. The basin of the Iguaçu River has two major tributaries to the city: the rivers Boots and Sarapuí.

Draining an area of 726 square kilometers and covering the municipalities of Belford Roxo, Duque de Caxias, Nilópolis, Nova Iguaçu, Rio de Janeiro and São João de Meriti, the watershed of the Iguaçu River has its headwaters located in Sierra Tinguá; its course develops in the southwest direction, with a total length of 43 km and flowing into the bay. The Capivari, Pati and Tinguá on the left bank and right bank Botasà are the main tributaries of the Iguaçu River.

Rivers most important city are: Iguaçu, Boots, Sarapuí, Velhas, Outeiro, Silver and maxambomba. The quality of rivers and Boots Sarapuí, according to CONAMA, are classified as Class 2: are water bodies that can be used for domestic supply, if they are treated conventionally. With proper care, these waters are also suitable for the protection of aquatic communities, primary contact recreation, fruit plants and irrigation of vegetables, and natural creation and / or intensive species for human consumption.

However, these rivers are very polluted, being compared to sewage ditches in the open, with indicative serious organic and faecal pollution and heavy metals such as nickel and lead. According FEEMA, it appears, also, the presence of cadmium, chromium and iron.

Climate 

The climate is tropical, presenting average monthly temperatures between 21 °C and 27 °C, with an annual average of 26 °C. The lowest temperature ever recorded in Belford Roxo was 6 °C, in July 2000. The annual rainfall fi ed around 1,229 mm. The rainy season starts in November and ends in March, and the dry season is from June to August.

Because it is situated near the Tropic of Capricorn, the Baixada Fluminense is influenced by winds from the Amazon and the Atlantic Ocean. As a marshland, the winds do not hit much at ground height, increasing the sensation of heat, with temperatures often rising from 30 °C.

Demography 

The municipality of Belford Roxo has an area of 77,815 square kilometers. The urban area of the municipality accounted for approximately 64,773 square kilometers, or 85.20% of its area in 2000.

In 2010, 469,261 inhabitants lived in Belford Roxo, divided into 226,757 men and 242,504 women, according to IBGE surveys in 2010; but the Ministry of Health increased that number by 5% when funds are transferred from the Single System health for the city, raising it to 492,724 residents. According to the Brazilian Institute of Geography and Statistics, Belford Roxo had 302,637 voters in 2010. For 2014, the population was estimated at 479,386. 

The Municipal Human Development Index (HDI) of Belford Roxo is considered average by the United Nations Development Programme (UNDP), and its value to 0.684. Although it is located in the state of Rio de Janeiro, which has the 4th highest HDI in Brazil, the value of the city index is below the state average (0.768), and country (0.744). There is still a wide disparity in social indicators of the municipality and other neighboring localities, revealing a history of abandonment, and regional inequality.

The per capita income is R7140.38, the literacy rate is 91.99% and life expectancy is 67.64 years. The gross rate of school attendance is 78.01%, [22] The incidence of poverty in 2003, measured by the IBGE, was 60%, and the Gini coefficient, which measures inequality, was 0.49 in 2000, with 1.00 the worst number and 0.00 the best.

References

Municipalities in Rio de Janeiro (state)